The United Nations Special Rapporteur on Torture and Other Cruel, Inhuman or Degrading Treatment or Punishment is a United Nations special rapporteur. The office is currently filled by Alice Jill Edwards, since 1 August 2022. It was previously held by Nils Melzer and before him Juan E. Méndez.

Table

References

External links
Official website

 
Torture